The 1926 New Zealand census was the eighteenth national population census. The day used for the census was Tuesday, 20 April 1926. The total population of the Dominion of New Zealand was counted as 1,408,140, an increase of 136,473 people or 10.73% since the 1921 census.

The New Zealand and South Seas International Exhibition was held during the census and due to its large visitor numbers (for example, on 1 May 1926, 84,000 visitors were counted at the exhibition), the results of the census were skewed.

References

Censuses in New Zealand
Census
New Zealand